Dirk Schneider (born in 1968) is a German film director and author.

Life and career 
Dirk Schneider studied journalism in Leipzig and worked as an author during this time. In the early 1990s, he collaborated with Ariane Riecker and Annett Schwarz to produce the following non-fiction books:  Stasi intim. Gespräche mit ehemaligen MfS-Angehörigen (Talking to former MfS officials) (1990) and Laienspieler : sechs Politikerporträts (Amateur players: six political portraits) : Peter-Michael Diestel, Gregor Gysi, Regine Hildebrandt, Günther Krause, Wolfgang Thierse, Konrad Weiss : and an interview with Friedrich Schorlemmer (1991).

Schneider then went into advertising. He was the owner and creative director of an advertising agency in Leipzig for ten years, but returned to film in 2005. First as co-author, then (since 2009) as author and director, he makes political and historical documentaries, reports, feature films and image films for various institutions and TV stations. His main topics are usually recent history of the GDR and Germany after the fall of the Berlin Wall.

Filmography 

 2005: Seine Hoheit ist zurück
 2005: OP am grünen Herzen
 2006: Oberhof: Weiße Pracht und große Pläne
 2008: Volkszählung in der Antarktis
 2008: Mission Antarktis
 2009: Wie der Stahl gehärtet wurde. Die Maxhütte Unterwellenborn.
 2010: Die Tornado-Katastrophe von Großenhain
 2010: Das Ende des Farbfilms. AGFA, ORWO und die DDR.
 2011: Blackout. Der Stromkollaps des 4. November 2006
 2011: Die Brücke zu Nienburg.
 2011: Hans Zimmer. Der Sound für Hollywood
 2011: Das Ende in der Schaukurve.
 2017: Geheimnisvolle Orte. Der Grenzbahnhof Probstzella
 2017: Wer bezahlt den Osten?
 2017: Schneekopf: Hochposten im Thüringer Wald
 2018: Wer braucht den Osten?
 2018: Bischofferode. Das Treuhand-Trauma

Awards 

 Ernst-Schneider-Preis 2012 (for: Stromkollaps)
 Preis der Friedrich- und Isabell-Vogelstiftung für herausragenden Wirtschaftsjournalismus 2017, together with Ariane Riecker (for: Wer bezahlt den Osten?)
 Medienpreis Mittelstand 2018, together with Ariane Riecker (for: Wer bezahlt den Osten?)
 Preis der Friedrich- und Isabell-Vogelstiftung für herausragenden Wirtschaftsjournalismus 2018, together with Ariane Riecker (for: Wer braucht den Osten?)

Books 

 Stasi intim. Gespräche mit ehemaligen MfS-Angehörigen, Leipzig, Forum 1990, 
 Laienspieler : sechs Politikerporträts : Peter-Michael Diestel, Gregor Gysi, Regine Hildebrandt, Günther Krause, Wolfgang Thierse, Konrad Weiss : und ein Interview mit Friedrich Schorlemmer, Leipzig, Forum 1991,

References

External links 
 Official Website

1968 births
Living people
German documentary film directors
Film directors from Thuringia
People from Schmalkalden-Meiningen